The Beach Nut is the 11th animated cartoon short subject in the Woody Woodpecker series. Released theatrically on October 16, 1944, the film was produced by Walter Lantz Productions and distributed by Universal Pictures. The title is a play on "beech nut".

Plot
The film opens in medias res with vacationer Wally Walrus beating Woody Woodpecker into submission on a beachfront amusement pier. Wally explains to the gathered crowd what happened earlier to provoke his anger:

Wally decides to go to the beach to relax for his day off, but is constantly disturbed by surfer Woody. Returning to the present, Wally ties Woody to an anchor and hurls him into the ocean. The rope snags on the pier, demolishing first the pier and then the entire marina. The cartoon ends with Woody swimming away toward the horizon, pursued by Wally, and both of them pursued by the other beachgoers.

Production notes
The Beach Nut marked the debut of Woody Woodpecker's recurring antagonist, Wally Walrus. Voiced by actor Jack Mather, Wally became Woody's primary rival until 1948, before being replaced with Buzz Buzzard in Wet Blanket Policy. Woody would lose more battles to Wally than any other of Woody's opponents.

References

External links

The Beach Nut at the Big Cartoon Database

1944 animated films
Walter Lantz Productions shorts
Woody Woodpecker films
1940s American animated films
Universal Pictures animated short films
Animated films about animals
Animated films about birds
Films set on beaches
1944 films
Films directed by James Culhane